Ifigenia in Tauride is an opera in three acts by Tommaso Traetta to a libretto by Marco Coltellini. It premiered on 4 October 1763 at Schönbrunn Palace, Vienna. The opera was revived at the Schwetzingen Festival in December 2013 conducted by Wolfgang Katschner.

References

External links

Operas by Tommaso Traetta
Italian-language operas
Operas based on Iphigenia in Tauris
Operas based on classical mythology
Operas
1763 operas